Jean DeWolff is a fictional character appearing in American comic books published by Marvel Comics. She is a New York City police detective, and a supporting character in stories featuring the superhero Spider-Man. Introduced in Marvel Team-Up #48 (August 1976) and created by Bill Mantlo and Sal Buscema, DeWolff is portrayed as tough and unrelenting, the result of her difficult childhood and teenage years, yet supporting of superheroes, especially Spider-Man, for whom she secretly develops romantic feelings. The 1985 storyline "The Death of Jean DeWolff" depicts the character's death at the hands of her partner and lover, Stanley Carter, who had become the murderous vigilante "Sin-Eater".

Publication history
Jean DeWolff first appeared in Marvel Team-Up #48-51 (August–November 1976), and was created by Bill Mantlo and Sal Buscema. She was one of the few supporting cast members in Marvel Team-Up. DeWolff subsequently appeared in Marvel Team-Up #60-62 (August–October 1977), #65-66 (January–February 1978), #72 (August 1978), #88 (December 1979), Ms. Marvel #6-7 (June–July 1977), The Amazing Spider-Man #226 (March–April 1982), #239 (April 1983), and The Spectacular Spider-Man #103 (June 1985).

The character was killed off in the storyline "The Death of Jean DeWolff", spanning The Spectacular Spider-Man #107-110 (October 1985 – January 1986). She has since made posthumous appearances in The Sensational She-Hulk #53 (July 1993), Venom Super Special #1 (August 1995), and Spider-Man/Human Torch #4 (June 2005).

Jean DeWolff received an entry in the Official Handbook of the Marvel Universe Deluxe Edition #17, and The Official Handbook of the Marvel Universe: Spider-Man #1 (2005) and The Official Handbook of the Ultimate Marvel Universe: Fantastic Four and Spider-Man #1 (2005).

In 2010, comics journalist Jonathan Miller described DeWolff as "a secondary character that could facilitate a sense of continuity [in Marvel Team-Up], someone who knew only the costumed side of Peter's personality, and yet had a genuine relationship with him. Hard-edged and no-nonsense, DeWolff usually made her entrance in her vintage roadster, cigarette dangling from the corner of her mouth, a modern, post-feminist take on the classic tough-guy heroes of Dashiell Hammett and Mickey Spillane".

Fictional character biography

Early history 
Jean's first rejection comes as a child from her harsh and disapproving father Phillip DeWolff, an officer of the NYPD, who resents having a daughter rather than another son. Her mother Celia gets divorced from Phillip six months after Jean's birth, taking her older brother Brian DeWolff with her. Jean and Brian develop a close and loving relationship over the years despite their parents' separation. Four years after the divorce, Celia marries police patrolman Carl Weatherby, who gives Jean the love she never got from her real father. Inspired by Carl, Jean joins the police academy as an adult, but this breaks Celia's heart, as she views the police force as a source of stress and danger. It also angers her father, who is now the New York police commissioner; he dismisses Jean and other women as unfit for police duty while showering praise on Brian for joining the NYPD after graduating top of his class at the academy. Just before Jean graduates from the academy, witnesses see Brian shot in the line of duty, but the body disappears before police or rescue services arrive. Phillip retires as police commissioner soon afterward.

Driven by resentment towards her disapproving parents and fueled by anger and grief over Brian's apparent death, DeWolff grows into a tough, unrelenting police officer. She quickly rises in the ranks, becoming a detective and then a sergeant, known for her no-nonsense attitude, as well as her vintage car and preference for 1930s-style clothing. Just over two years after her father's retirement, DeWolff is promoted by his successor to the rank of captain, running Manhattan's 5th precinct.

While investigating bombings by a criminal known only as the Wraith, DeWolff discovers Spider-Man and Iron Man are also looking into the matter. While many in the NYPD don't care for super-powered vigilantes, Jean sees value in the web-slinger and the armored Avenger and openly asks them for assistance, going so far as to allow the two access to precinct files. The two heroes, along with Doctor Strange, help DeWolff discover that the Wraith is her psionically-powered brother who is alive but in a coma, his actions the result of her corrupt father's machinations. Doctor Strange's combination of magic and surgical skills restores Brian's mind. Phillip is sent to prison, and Jean welcomes her brother back as he rejoins the NYPD.

The DeWolff siblings continue to aid superheroes on different occasions, with Jean developing a regular working relationship and friendship with Spider-Man, despite her acerbic attitude and the web-slinger's need to keep his identity and full life separate. On Spider-Man's request, DeWolff even draws up amnesty papers for the Black Cat so she can retire from crime and become Spider-Man's romantic partner and ally in crime-fighting. When the Black Cat is later seriously injured and hospitalized, DeWolff personally assigns her a protection detail in case any enemies try to take advantage of the situation.

Death 
Jean later receives former S.H.I.E.L.D. agent Stanley Carter as her partner, and the two develop a close bond, eventually becoming lovers. Unbeknownst to Jean, however, Carter has an obsession with punishing criminals, which is only worsened by his experiences as a cop, to the point where he decides all "sinners" need to die. Suffering a psychotic break, Carter, now calling himself the "Sin-Eater", embarks on a killing spree, resulting in DeWolff being shot dead in her home and Spider-Man embarking on a quest for revenge. Eventually, Spider-Man and Daredevil bring Sin-Eater to justice.

Following Jean's death, Spider-Man discovers the woman kept a collection of news clippings, as well as a photo of Spider-Man with Black Cat that was cut to remove the latter from the image. Spider-Man is shocked by the implication that Jean had unspoken feelings for him over the years. It is later revealed that when Spider-Man temporarily used the Venom symbiote as a costume, Jean spoke to Spider-Man about her feelings, saying the hero was the only other person she felt she could rely on and she loved him, not knowing that the alien symbiote was in control and lacked a full understanding of human behavior. When Spider-Man silently leaned in for a kiss (the alien symbiote believing this was the expected human response to words of love), DeWolff seemed to feel awkward and clarified that she loved him as a friend, adding that she would prefer never to speak about this conversation again.

Jean's death also drives her family apart: Celia blames Carl for her daughter's death as Carl had inspired her to join the police force in the first place. Driven mad with grief over Sin-Eater's murder of his sister, Brian declares vengeance against the entire NYPD before being shot and killed with an explosive bullet by a lethal vigilante.

Post-mortem 
Years after Jean's death, her close friend Yuri Watanabe, who had also risen to the rank of Captain and used her position to assist Spider-Man, adopts the Wraith identity after losing faith in the law's ability to punish criminals. She wears a mask of Jean's face originally created by the Chameleon under her Wraith costume, as both a means of hiding her true identity and frightening criminals into believing that the Wraith was Jean's vengeful spirit risen to continue fighting crime.

A clone of Jean appears during the Dead No More: The Clone Conspiracy event. This clone, a "reanimate" with all of Jean's memories including her death, lives in a special facility called "Haven" and is created by a villain wishing to gain Spider-Man's cooperation by resurrecting all those whose deaths haunt the web-slinger. A machine connected to Haven is later activated that destabilizes the bodies of the reanimates, making them vulnerable to infection by the deadly Carrion virus dormant in their clone cells. Several reanimates attempt to escape, hoping their bodies will stabilize if they are far enough away from Haven. Realizing that fleeing means potentially transmitting the Carrion virus to innocent people outside of Haven, Jean's clone assists Spider-Man in stopping any clones from escaping. During her efforts, she succumbs to the virus and dies.

When Spider-Man confronts Kindred during the "Last Remains" arc, he finds that the demon had dug up the bodies of Jean DeWolff, Uncle Ben, Gwen Stacy, George Stacy, Ned Leeds, J. Jonah Jameson Sr., and Marla Jameson and sat them around a dinner table.

Other versions

Spider-Gwen
In the Spider-Gwen reality, Jean DeWolff is partnered with Captain Frank Castle on the NYPD's Special Crimes Task Force.

Spider-Man Noir
Spider-Man Noir: Eyes Without A Face features FBI Agent Jean De Wolfe, who is trying to track down the Crime Master. Initially skeptical of Spider-Man Noir's motives in crimefighting, Agent De Wolfe later comes to his aid. In keeping with the 1930s setting, this version of the character is male. Although Alaska P. Davidson was made a special agent with the FBI in 1922 along with two other women, none were active by 1929 and the FBI did not officially accept female agents again until 1972.

Ultimate Marvel
In the Ultimate Marvel universe, the character is renamed Jeanne De Wolfe, which writer Brian Michael Bendis said is in reference to her ambiguous morality. In her first appearance (where her name was written akin to the regular Marvel Universe), she is shown responding to a bank robbery being carried out by a criminal dressed as Spider-Man, who kills NYPD Captain John Stacy before the real Spider-Man arrives and nearly murders the imposter in a rage, ultimately choosing to web him up so he can be arrested. Her next appearance (where this version's spelling is introduced) is following a fight between Spider-Man and Gladiator. She is the first police officer not to shoot Spider-Man on sight, and orders others in her squad not to arrest him. Spider-Man is pleased to have an ally in official law enforcement, and she continues to help during the "Hobgoblin" and "Warriors" storylines. However, it is later revealed that Jeanne is in fact a dirty cop employed by Wilson Fisk to feed him information on the police, Spider-Man, and other superheroes. Jeanne is shot and killed by the Punisher when he discovers her corruption. Afterwards, Spider-Man learns she was in the Kingpin's employ, as well as a rumor that she was his lover. The Kingpin is later seen mourning her death, indicating that this was the case Her position in the NYPD is filled by officer Frank Quaid.

In other media

Television
 Jean DeWolff appears in The Spectacular Spider-Man, voiced by Irene Bedard. This version is a patrol officer of Native American descent and the partner of Stan Carter, with whom she shares a squad car, who is generally distrustful of Spider-Man despite Carter's enthusiasm for him.

Video games
 Jean DeWolff, renamed Jean DeWolfe, appears in the PS3, Xbox 360, and PC versions of the Spider-Man 3 film tie-in game, voiced by Vanessa Marshall. This version is a police detective with trust issues. Throughout the game, she gives Spider-Man a series of missions that involve investigating a gun-running ring and several crooked cops. She is later lured into a trap by her corrupt partners and almost killed, though Spider-Man rescues her.
 In the Nintendo DS version, DeWolfe is depicted as an African-American with long blonde hair. She gives Spider-Man leads on several gangs, including the Apocalypse Gang and the Dragon-tail Brotherhood. 
 Jean DeWolff appears in Marvel Heroes, voiced by Mary Faber. After witnessing the Enforcers trying to kill the hero Speedball, she kills the group to save the latter's life. However, the Kingpin obtains video footage of the incident and blackmails DeWolff into becoming one of his informants. Her double life is discovered by reporter Ben Urich, who mentions it to the other heroes. After helping defeat Bullseye, DeWolff has a change of heart and turns herself in.
 Jean DeWolff appears in The Amazing Spider-Man 2 film tie-in game, voiced by Misty Lee. This version is a maverick cop who is secretly gathering information on a number of powerful New York criminal organizations and bosses with the intent of taking them all down.

References

External links
A short biography
Jean DeWolff at Marvel.com
 

Fictional characters from New York City
Comics characters introduced in 1976
Spider-Man characters
Fictional New York City Police Department captains
Characters created by Sal Buscema
Characters created by Bill Mantlo
Marvel Comics female characters
Marvel Comics police officers
Fictional murdered people